Bryan Jacob (born February 1, 1969) is an American former weightlifter. He competed at the 1992 Summer Olympics and the 1996 Summer Olympics.

References

External links
 

1969 births
Living people
American male weightlifters
Olympic weightlifters of the United States
Weightlifters at the 1992 Summer Olympics
Weightlifters at the 1996 Summer Olympics
People from Palatka, Florida
Pan American Games medalists in weightlifting
Pan American Games silver medalists for the United States
Weightlifters at the 1991 Pan American Games
Weightlifters at the 1995 Pan American Games
20th-century American people
21st-century American people